The Do Meio River is a river of Bahia state in eastern Brazil.  It is a tributary of the Corrente River.

See also
List of rivers of Bahia

References
Brazilian Ministry of Transport

Rivers of Bahia